WordAlive Publishers provides transformational content by publishing, marketing and distributing Christian books in sub-Saharan Africa and beyond.
WordAlive Publishers is a Pan-African publishing house based in Nairobi, Kenya, with offices in Kampala, Uganda. The company's main focus is on personal growth, inspiration, leadership, relationship, fiction, theology, and children's books. WordAlive's catalogue contains more than 70 titles from both local and international authors. In 2009, Eyo, the first general fiction title in their catalogue was published.

History
WordAlive Publishers was founded in September 2001 by David Waweru, whose publishing career had begun at the University of Nairobi Press ten years earlier. At the time, most publishing houses in Kenya focused on textbook publishing with a few others engaged in religious publishing and none publishing general trade books as a core business. Many cited perceived poor reading habits in Kenya and poverty as reasons why they did not think that these areas were viable propositions. WordAlive now accounts for 35% of their sales from "upcountry" – outside Kenyan's major towns – areas that are considered "poor" by Kenyan standards.

WordAlive is the African publisher of the Africa Bible Commentary, a 1,586-page one-volume commentary released in 2006 and written by 69 African scholars. The commentary aims to use African proverbs, metaphors and everyday stories to convey to text of the Bible to African believers while remaining true to the text and being honest to its context.

In 2008 WordAlive Publishers, together with Africa Christian Text Books, based in Jos, Nigeria, and Zondervan in the US, created an imprint called Hippo Books. "The imprint is  a broad range of serious Christian and Theological publications written especially for Pastors, church leaders, and academics (Theological Students, Teachers, and Scholars). Titles in this imprint include Bible commentaries and new works in biblical studies, cultural studies, ethics, history, systematic theology, and more."

Works published
Notable works and authors published by Word Alive Publishers include:
Eyo, Abidemi Sanusi (2009) View Eyo
Africa Bible Commentary, Tokunboh Adeyemo (2006) View Africa Bible Commentary
Africa's Enigma and Leadership Solutions, Tokunboh Adeyemo (2009) View Africa Enigma and Leadership Solutions
Best Foot Forward, Fred Geke (2007) view Best Foot Forward
How to Save Money, Ken Monyoncho (2007) view How to Save Money
Bishop Tucker, Christopher Byaruhanga (2008) view Bishop Tucker
African Christian Ethics, Samuel Waje Kunhiyop (2008) view African Christian Ethics
Is Africa Cursed, Tokunboh Adeyemo (2009) view Is Africa Cursed

References

External links
 WordAlive Publishers Site
 David Waweru, CEO WordAlive Publishing

Publishing companies established in 2001
Book publishing company imprints
Companies based in Nairobi
2001 establishments in Kenya
Book publishing companies of Kenya